Valeriu (Vali) Sterian (21 September 1952, in Știubei, Buzău County – 16 September 2000, in Bucharest) was a Romanian folk and rock musician.

Studies

He studied at the University of Bucharest and obtained a BA in psychology.

Musical activity

Valeriu Sterian started as a drummer during secondary school in the music band Copiii Florilor (Flower Children). His official debut was in 1973 at the Ballads' Spring Festival (Festivalul Primavara Baladelor) (where he received the Best Song Award for the single Nopți (Nights). At that time he was performing with Carmen Marin as Vali și Carmen.

He played for many years within the Cenaclul Flacăra. In 1979 he founded a music band called Compania de Sunet (Sound Company), with which he toured all over the country and also in Bulgaria, Hungary, USSR, Poland, Norway, France, United Kingdom, and in the United States.

In 1993 he founded a record company called B'Inișor ("Pretty well"). He collaborated with other Romanian musicians, such as: Alexandru Andrieș, Nicu Alifantis, Doru Stănculescu, Mircea Bodolan, Maria Gheorghiu.

Personal life
He was a beautiful Romanian soul who fought for freedom and justice in Romania as well as an accomplished artist and musician. His commitment to freedom and social justice cannot ever be put in doubt.

Discography

 Muzică folk – Folk Music (Electrecord, 1975)
 Antirăzboinică – The antiwar one (Electrecord, 1979)
 Veac XX – Century XX (Electrecord, 1982)
 Nimic fără oameni – Nothing Without Beings (Electrecord, 1989)
 Nopți – Nights (Norway, 1990)
 Vino, Doamne! – Come down, Saviour! (Compania de Sunet & Metropol Music, 1991)
 S-a votat Codul penal – The Criminal Law is now enforced (Compania de Sunet & Eurostar, 1992)
 Evenimentul zilei... și altele –  Daily News ... and much more (Compania de Sunet, 1994)
 Rugă – The Prayer (Compania de Sunet & Roton, 1998)
 The Very Best of Valeriu Sterian (Fundația Culturală Phoenix, 2000)
 Din darul magilor 5 – In memoriam Valeriu Sterian – Tribute album (Fundația Culturală Phoenix, 2000)
 Muzică de colecție, Vol. 66 – Vali Sterian (Jurnalul Național, Compania de Sunet & Electrecord, 2008)

External links
 The World of Sterian – Unofficial Site

1952 births
2000 deaths
Romanian musicians
Romanian rock musicians
Burials at Bellu Cemetery